Sunderland Nissan F.C. was a football club based in Sunderland, England. They joined the Wearside League Division Two as founding members in 1988. Their original name was Washington Nissan. In the 2005–06 and 2008–09 seasons, they reached the 2nd round of the FA Vase. For the 2008–09 season, their last, they were members of the Northern League Division One. They played at the Nissan Sports Complex. All of their players were employees of the Nissan Motor Manufacturing Plant NMUK in Sunderland.

In 2009 the club dissolved when the company stopped further funds to the club.

Honours
Northern League Div 2: R-Up: 2004–05
Northern League Cup: R-Up: 2006–07
Wearside: 1993–94, 99–2000, 01–02
Div 2: R-Up: 1989–90
League Cup: 1992–93, 93–94, 96–97, R-Up: 1991–92, 98–99
Monkwearmouth Charity Cup: 1996–97 R-Up: 1995–96, 2000–01
Nissan European Trophy: (x3)

References

External links 
 nissanfc.co.uk
 
 
 

Defunct football clubs in England
Defunct football clubs in Tyne and Wear
Association football clubs established in 1988
Association football clubs disestablished in 2009
1988 establishments in England
2009 disestablishments in England
Wearside Football League
Northern Football League
Works association football teams in England